John Michael Montgomery (born August 13, 1991) is an American politician serving as a member of the Oklahoma Senate from the 32nd district. Elected in November 2018, he assumed office on January 14, 2019.

Early life and education 
Montgomery was born and raised in Lawton, Oklahoma, where he graduated from Eisenhower High School. He earned a Bachelor of Arts degree in international relations and affairs and a Master of Arts in global studies from the University of Oklahoma.

Career 
Prior to entering politics, Montgomery worked as an insurance agent for Northwestern Mutual and New York Life. He represented the 62nd district in the Oklahoma House of Representatives from 2015 to 2019. He was elected to the Oklahoma Senate in November 2018 and assumed office on January 14, 2019. Montgomery also serves as vice chair of the Senate Retirement and Insurance Committee.

References 

1991 births
Living people
People from Lawton, Oklahoma
University of Oklahoma alumni
Republican Party Oklahoma state senators
Republican Party members of the Oklahoma House of Representatives
21st-century American politicians